The Bangladesh cricket team toured New Zealand in January 2022 to play two Test matches. The Test series formed part of the 2021–2023 ICC World Test Championship. In September 2021, the tour dates were moved back slightly due to COVID-19 quarantine requirements for travelling to New Zealand. Initially the tour was also scheduled to include three Twenty20 International matches. However, these were dropped from the itinerary when the dates were confirmed by New Zealand Cricket in November 2021.

Bangladesh won the first Test by eight wickets. It was Bangladesh's first win in Test cricket against New Zealand, and their first win in international cricket against New Zealand in New Zealand. However, New Zealand went on to win the second Test inside three days, beating Bangladesh by an innings and 117 runs, to draw the series 1–1. It was also Ross Taylor's final Test match, after he had announced his retirement from international cricket in December 2021.

Squads

Shakib Al Hasan was originally named in Bangladesh's squad, but was granted approval by the Bangladesh Cricket Board (BCB) to miss the tour. Fazle Mahmud was named as Shakib Al Hasan's replacement.

Tour match
Ahead of the Test series, two tour matches were scheduled to be played. However, the first match was cancelled due to an increase in quarantine requirements for the Bangladesh team in New Zealand.

Test series

1st Test

2nd Test

Notes

References

External links
 Series home at ESPN Cricinfo

2021 in Bangladeshi cricket
2021 in New Zealand cricket
International cricket competitions in 2021–22
Bangladeshi cricket tours of New Zealand